D'Alessio is an Italian surname. Notable people with the surname include:

Andrés J. d'Alessio (1940–2009), Argentine academic
Carlos d'Alessio (1935–1992), French composer
Charlotte D'Alessio (born 1998), Canadian model
Corrie D'Alessio (born 1969), Canadian ice hockey player
Ernesto D'Alessio (born 1977), Mexican actor
Gigi D'Alessio (born 1967), Italian pop singer and songwriter
Jillian D'Alessio (born 1985), Canadian Olympic kayaker
Lupita D'Alessio (born 1954), Mexican singer and actress 
Ugo D'Alessio (1909–1979), Italian film actor

Italian-language surnames
Patronymic surnames
Surnames from given names